Turkish names in space are the following:

Mercury 
 Sinan (crater)
 Berkel (crater)

Venus 
 Adivar (crater)
 Guzel (crater) 
 Faina (crater)

Mars 
 Bozkir crater
 Can crater
 Hashir crater
 Sinop crater
 Tarsus (crater)
 Zir crater

Moons

Enceladus 
 Harran Sulci, a region of grooved terrain

Pluto 
 Nasreddin (crater)

Asteroids 
 1174 Marmara
 1457 Ankara
 11695 Mattei
 13096 Tigris
 20936 Nemrut Dagi
 266854 Sezenaksu

951 Gaspra 
 Yalova crater

External links 
 https://www.yenisafak.com/foto-galeri/teknoloji/21-adet-turk-ismi-uzayda-2021840
 https://www.fikriyat.com/galeri/yasam/aydaki-kraterlere-verilen-turk-isimleri

Space program of Turkey
Astronomical nomenclature by nation